The 1991 African Women's Handball Championship was the ninth edition of the African Women's Handball Championship, held in Egypt. It acted as the African qualifying tournament for the 1992 Summer Olympics.

Standings

Matches

Final ranking

External links
Results on todor66.com

1991 Women
African Women's Handball Championship
African Women's Handball Championship
African Women's Handball Championship
1991 in African handball
Women's handball in Egypt
1991 in African women's sport